Cecil is an unincorporated community in Franklin County, Arkansas, United States. Cecil has a post office with ZIP code 72930.

Climate
The climate in this area is characterized by hot, humid summers and generally mild to cool winters.  According to the Köppen Climate Classification system, Cecil has a humid subtropical climate, abbreviated "Cfa" on climate maps.

Things To Do 
In the heart of Cecil is a restaurant, which is referred to as the "Cecil Store". Cecil is also home to Citadel Bluff park which is now only boat ramp accessible.

References 

Unincorporated communities in Franklin County, Arkansas
Unincorporated communities in Arkansas